The 10th Vuelta a España (Tour of Spain), a long-distance bicycle stage race and one of the three grand tours, was held from 25 April to 8 May 1955. Fiorenzo Magni won the points classification and Giuseppe Buratti won the mountains classification.

Teams and riders

Route

Results

References

 
1955
1955 in Spanish sport
1955 in road cycling